The 2016 DHB-Pokal was the 41st edition of the tournament.

Format
The first round was split in a north and a south part and played in mini tournaments where only the winner advance to the round of 16. From there on a knockout system was used to determine the winner. The final four will be played on one weekend in Hamburg.

Round 1
Games were played on 27 and 28 August 2016.

|-
|colspan=3 style="text-align:center;" |North
|-
|colspan=3 style="text-align:center;" |Played in Rostock

|-
|colspan=3 style="text-align:center;" |Played in Minden

|-
|colspan=3 style="text-align:center;" |Played in Nordhorn

|-
|colspan=3 style="text-align:center;" |Played in Hamm

|-
|colspan=3 style="text-align:center;" |Played in Wilhelmshaven

|-
|colspan=3 style="text-align:center;" |Played in Essen

|-
|colspan=3 style="text-align:center;" |Played in Bad Schwartau

|-
|colspan=3 style="text-align:center;" |Played in Solingen

|-
|colspan=3 style="text-align:center;" |South
|-
|colspan=3 style="text-align:center;" |Played in Erlangen

|-
|colspan=3 style="text-align:center;" |Played in Bietigheim

|-
|colspan=3 style="text-align:center;" |Played in Lößnitz

|-
|colspan=3 style="text-align:center;" |Played in Kreuztal

|-
|colspan=3 style="text-align:center;" |Played in Saarlouis

|-
|colspan=3 style="text-align:center;" |Played in Fürstenfeldbruck

|-
|colspan=3 style="text-align:center;" |Played in Coburg

|-
|colspan=3 style="text-align:center;" |Played in Neuhausen

|}

Round 2
The draw was held on 31 August 2016.

Quarterfinals
The draw was held on 2 November 2016.

Final four
The final four was held on 8 and 9 April 2017 at the Barclaycard Arena in Hamburg. The draw was held on 13 January 2017.

Bracket

Semifinals

Final

References

External links
Official website

2017
2016 in German sport
2017 in German sport